Rangataua is a small village in the North Island of New Zealand. It is located at the southern end of both the Tongariro National Park and Rangataua State Forest, adjacent to the southwestern slopes of the active volcano Mount Ruapehu. Part of the Manawatū-Whanganui region, the town is 5 kilometres east of Ohakune,  75 kilometres northeast of Wanganui, and 20 kilometres west of Waiouru.

The village's permanent population work in the nearby region with much of the seasonal population working at the Turoa Skifield. When the timber industry was at its peak, Rangataua had a population of 957 in 1914.

Rangataua contains many properties that are owned as holiday villas or baches usually used for skiing at the nearby Turoa Skifield.

Transportation
State Highway 49 runs immediately adjacent to the village, as does the North Island Main Trunk railway. There is no station and all passenger rail traffic uses the railway station at Ohakune.

History
The name Rangataua comes from two Māori words: Ranga - to parade in ranks; to fall in, and taua - war party. Rangataua  was the site of a Māori village. In the mid seventeenth century this village was attacked and subsequently destroyed. The survivors of the attack established a Pā on the site of present-day Ohakune.

The town grew rapidly after the railway opened. A 1909 report said a billiard room, hair-dressing saloon, stationery shop and bakery were open, or being built. Marino and Piwari Streets were nearing completion and Miharo was expected to be a business street. A skating rink opened in 1911.

The Raetihi Forest Fire of March 19–20, 1918 almost destroyed Rangataua. Many houses and sawmills were burnt down. Fires had previously threatened the town in January 1914.

Demographics

The population of Rangataua was 132 in the 2018 New Zealand census, unchanged since the 2013 census, and an increase of 12 (10.%) since the 2006 census. There were 63 males and 69 females, giving a sex ratio of 0.91 males per female. Ethnicities were 117 people  (88.6%) European/Pākehā, 39 (29.5%) Māori, 3 (2.3%) Pacific peoples, and 3 (2.3%) Asian (totals add to more than 100% since people could identify with multiple ethnicities). Of the total population, 36 people  (27.3%) were under 15 years old, 24 (18.2%) were 15–29, 66 (50.0%) were 30–64, and 9 (6.8%) were over 65.

Conservation areas
To the immediate east of the village is the 6710 hectare Rangataua Conservation Area, which is contiguous with the UNESCO World Heritage Site Tongariro National Park on its northern boundary. Rangataua is bounded to the north by the 58 hectare Rangataua Scenic Reserve, and to the immediate southeast by the 77 hectare Mangaehuehu Scenic Reserve.

See also
Ruapehu District

References

External links
1909 photos of tree stumps and buildings and of post office

Populated places in Manawatū-Whanganui
Ruapehu District